is a 1988 Japanese film directed by Kazuo Kuroki.

Awards and nominations
13th Hochi Film Award
Won: Best Film

References

External links
 

1988 films
Films directed by Kazuo Kuroki
1980s Japanese-language films
1980s Japanese films